The 1998–99 Algerian Championnat National was the 37th season of the Algerian Championnat National since its establishment in 1962. A total of 28 teams contested the league, with USM El Harrach as the defending champions, The Championnat started on September 10, 1998. and ended on May 31, 1999.

Team summaries

Promotion and relegation 
Teams promoted from Algerian Division 2 1998-1999 
 No Promotion

Teams relegated to Algerian Division 2 1999-2000
   
 ES Mostaganem
 JSM Tiaret
 GC Mascara
 RC Kouba
 ASM Oran
 CS Constantine
 AS Aïn M'lila
 USM El Harrach
 NA Hussein Dey
 JSM Tébessa

Teams relegated to Algerian Division 3 1999-2000
  
 US Chaouia
 CA Bordj Bou Arreridj
 E Sour El Ghozlane
 SA Mohammadia
 WA Boufarik
 IRB Hadjout

Group A

League table

Result table

Group B

League table

Result table

Match for the Arab Cup

Championship final

References

External links
1998–99 Algerian Championnat National

Algerian Championnat National
Championnat National
Algerian Ligue Professionnelle 1 seasons